Jocelino Suta (born  in Port Vila ) is a French rugby union player who plays as a lock for RC Toulonnais.

After his birth in Port Vila, capital of the Republic of Vanuatu, planted in the heart of the Pacific near to Fiji, Jocelino Suta grew up in Wallis-etFutuna, a French archipelago, from where his parents originated, and then in New Caledonia where he was educated from the age of 10 years.

He is the cousin of prop Mikaele Tuugahala. After the 2007-08 Rugby Pro D2 season led to a promotion for Stade Montois to the Top 14, he planned on joining Racing Métro 92 Paris. Since the club stayed in Pro D2, he moved to RC Toulonnais, another promoted club. In May 2013 he played as a replacement as Toulon won the 2013 Heineken Cup Final by 16–15 against Clermont Auvergne.

Career 
 Until 2008 : Stade Montois (trained at club) 
 Since 2008 : RC Toulon

Honours

Club 
 Winner of the finals of Pro D2 : 2008

National team 
 French Barbarians in 2008 (Canada)

References

External links 
  Player profile at lequipe.fr
  Statistics at itsrugby.fr
 
 NABANGA The Quarterly Newsletter of the British Friends of Vanuatu - Number 115 January 2013

French rugby union players
Rugby union locks
1982 births
RC Toulonnais players
Living people
Rugby union players from Wallis and Futuna
France international rugby union players